The  is a 3.6 km link which connects Keio Corporation's Keiō Line from Sasazuka Station in Shibuya to Shinjuku Station with through service on to the Shinjuku Line of the Tokyo Metropolitan Bureau of Transportation. The line opened on October 30, 1978.

Operations
The Keio New Line generally parallels the main Keio Line along National Route 20 (Kōshū Kaidō) on a deeper route.  Except for a short section just before Sasazuka Station, the entire line is underground.

Because the line was built to normal railway standards and not to subway standards, only specially-designed trains can travel along the Keio New Line. However, since new train cars are being designed to be able to operate on above-ground and below-ground tracks there is no real issue with the differentiation. All trains operating west of Sasazuka Station start and arrive at Shinjuku Station. During events at the Tokyo Racecourse, there are express trains that operate from Fuchūkeibaseimonmae Station to Shinjuku station.

The Keio New Line shares the same platforms with the Toei Shinjuku Line at Shinjuku Station. From here trains travel west-southwest. At Hatsudai Station, the westbound platform is two floors underground while the eastbound one is three floors underground. (Both platforms are on the north side of the station.) At Hatagaya Station both platforms are two floors underground with platforms on either side of the two central tracks. From this station, the Keio New line diverges from the Kōshū Kaidō and heads towards the Keio Line further south. The Keiō Line parallels the outside of the New Line on an elevated viaduct over Prefectural Route 420 (Nakano Dori) until Sasazuka Station.

Stations
Although there are four types of trains that travel along the Keio New Line segment (local, rapid, semi express, and express), all trains within the Keio New Line stop at every station.

History
The Keio New Line began operation on October 30, 1978. With the completion of the last segment of the Toei Shinjuku Line, through service operations began on March 30, 1980.

See also
 Keio Line

References

External links
 Keio Corporation website 
 Keio Corporation website 

New Line
Railway lines in Tokyo
4 ft 6 in gauge railways in Japan